"Daddy" is a song recorded and performed by American nu metal band Korn for their self-titled debut album (1994). It is the album's 12th and final track.

Concept
Jonathan Davis has stated that the song is about a painful experience of being molested as a child and not being believed. However, he denied it was about physical or sexual abuse at the hands of his father, and the title and some concepts within the song stem from his parents not believing him. The song caused many to assume that Jonathan's father Rick Davis had molested his son. It is a source of embarrassment for Rick, though his son has gone on the record in many interviews saying it was actually written about a family friend. Jonathan and Rick both decided not to say who the person was.

In an early Kerrang! magazine interview, Davis commented on the song:

In an interview with Rolling Stone, Davis stated that he was comfortable performing the song when it was played as part of the album's 20th anniversary. However, in a 2022 interview with Metal Hammer said he didn't want to perform it again. Davis has also uploaded a video discussing the song to YouTube. In the video, he said that the abuser was his babysitter; who had since died.

Music and structure
The song eventually leads to Davis being stranded in a room, and shouting hostile things presumably to the abuser, which then leads to Davis weeping for a long period of time as a lullaby by vocalist Judith Kiener is heard. The band continues on playing an instrumental version until eventually a door is heard shutting. The rest of the band did not know that the song was about Davis' childhood prior to recording.

After about five minutes of silence at the end of the song, a discussion can be heard; an audio clip that producer Ross Robinson found inside an abandoned house. The argument revolves around a man named Michael and his wife named Geri conversing about the installation of a car part (apparently an exhaust manifold on a Dodge Dart). Michael can be heard verbally abusing Geri over the merits of the installation. This hidden track is called "Michael & Geri".

Live performance
The song is notable for its popularity among fans, rarely being played live after the album version was recorded; an earlier version of the song was performed at a few of their first shows. Jonathan Davis says that the song is simply too personal for him to perform live.

"I don't play that song live because it's just magic," Davis said. "If I play that song over and over every night, it'd lose its meaning. I don't want people to expect me to freak out like I did on that. That was what happened in that point in time, and that magic was captured, and I don't want to fuck with it."

Korn announced they were going to play their self-titled album in full on tours to celebrate the 20th anniversary of the album, including playing "Daddy";  however, the band later stated they will only be playing their debut album in full at festivals, hence not playing "Daddy" on the Prepare for Hell tour with Slipknot and King 810.

Legacy
The song remains popular with fans, often ranked highly among other Korn songs. It is considered by many to be one of the most disturbing songs ever released, and is often cited as such on various polls and lists.

References

Korn songs
1994 songs
Songs about child abuse
Songs about fathers
Songs based on actual events
Songs written by Reginald Arvizu
Songs written by Jonathan Davis
Songs written by James Shaffer
Songs written by David Silveria
Songs written by Brian Welch
Songs about sexual assault
Works about child sexual abuse

it:Korn (album)#Daddy